The Belton flintlock was a repeating flintlock design using superposed loads, conceived by Philadelphia, Pennsylvania, resident Joseph Belton some time prior to 1777. The musket design was offered by Belton to the newly formed Continental Congress in 1777. Belton wrote that the musket could fire eight rounds with one loading, and that he could support his claims "by experimental proof." Belton failed to sell the musket to Congress, and later was unable to sell the design to the British Army a year after the American Revolution. There are no records that indicate that the gun was ever supplied, and it is uncertain if or how exactly the Belton improvement operated.

Musket design 
There are no known surviving examples of the musket Belton demonstrated to Congress. The only evidence of its existence is the correspondence between Belton and Congress. Belton described the musket as capable of firing up to "eight balls one after another, in eight, five or three seconds of time," at a distance of 25 to 30 yards. He also claimed to have a secret method of modifying this weapon to discharge "sixteen or twenty [balls], in sixteen, ten, or five seconds of time." Historian Harold L. Peterson argued that because it was described as having a predetermined number of shots and rate of fire, it may have worked with a single lock igniting a fused chain of charges stacked in a single barrel, packaged as a single large paper cartridge.

Congress commissioned Belton to build or modify 100 muskets for the military on May 3, 1777, but the order was cancelled on May 15, when Congress received Belton's bid and considered it an "extraordinary allowance." After the war, Belton attempted to sell the design to the British Army, without success.

Other Belton superposed load guns
While no examples of the converted muskets demonstrated to Congress are known, Belton did not give up on the concept of superposed load firearms.  After the American Revolution, Belton began looking for buyers for superposed load flintlocks in England.

East India Company Seven shot muskets 
Belton then began making superposed load flintlocks, which used a sliding lock mechanism, with the London gunsmith William Jover, and sold them to the East India Company in 1786.  An example of a seven shot sliding lock flintlock musket made by Jover and Belton may be found in the Royal Armouries Museum collection in Leeds.  This musket, rack numbered 124 (indicating a purchase and issue of at least 124 of the rifles), also has a replaceable chamber section.  The replaceable chamber makes this example both a breechloader, and effectively gives it a seven shot replaceable  magazine.  It is not known if multiple magazines were issued per gun, though this was possible (see  here for a similar scenario with percussion revolvers).  The  lock slides from front to rear, with a second trigger provided that slides the lock from touch hole to touch hole, allowing each successive charge to be ignited.  The lock did require cocking and priming between shots; while this would take time, the sliding lock would have provided a much higher rate of fire over a typical single shot musket of the era. 

The Belton sliding lock design was later improved and used in slightly more successful designs, such as Isaiah Jenning's repeating flintlock rifle.

Four shot pistol design
Today there are two surviving Belton and Jover pistols at the Pitt Rivers Museum at the University of Oxford, having four touch holes which permit four successive discharges.

References 

Early firearms
Flintlock repeaters